"Chapter 8: Redemption" is the eighth and final episode of the first season of the American streaming television series The Mandalorian. It was written by the series' showrunner Jon Favreau, directed by Taika Waititi, and released on Disney+ on December 27, 2019. The episode stars Pedro Pascal as the Mandalorian, a lone bounty hunter on the run with "the Child". The episode was nominated for four Primetime Emmy Awards, winning one of them. The episode received high praise for its action sequences, emotional weight, performances, music, and Waititi's direction.

Plot 
While the Mandalorian, Cara Dune, and Greef Karga are trapped, IG-11 rescues "the Child". The Mandalorian finds a vent into the sewers, where he hopes to find his people's hidden stronghold. Moff Gideon gives them until nightfall to surrender, or he will order his troops to fire. Gideon mentions the Mandalorian's real name, Din Djarin. The Mandalorian recognizes Gideon: Gideon had been an officer of the Empire's secret police when the Empire took over Mandalore. IG-11 arrives on a scout trooper's bike with the Child, blasting through the stormtroopers. The Mandalorian takes down several more but is almost killed by Gideon. As they take cover inside, Gideon orders a trooper with a flamethrower to burn them out; the Child uses the Force to reflect the flames and immolate the trooper. The Mandalorian and IG-11 remain behind while Dune and Karga take the Child into the sewers. Pointing out that seeing the Mandalorian's face is technically not a violation of the Mandalorian creed, as he is a droid and not a living being, IG-11 removes the Mandalorian's helmet revealing his face for the first time. After treating his injuries they then rejoin the others in the sewers.

Arriving at the Mandalorian enclave, they find it abandoned except for the Armorer, who explains that the Imperials found the enclave when the Mandalorians revealed themselves in an earlier episode. Upon seeing the Child, the Armorer is reminded of the Jedi, whom Mandalorians see as their ancient enemies. She instructs the Mandalorian to take the Child to the Jedi, wherever they might be; she also carves a Mudhorn signet into his pauldron and gives him a jetpack. While the Armorer remains behind, the Mandalorian, Dune, Karga, IG-11, and the Child escape down an underground lava river. IG-11 decides to sacrifice himself by walking into an ambush and activating his self-destruct. After they emerge from the tunnel, Gideon attacks in the TIE fighter in which he arrived. Using his jetpack, the Mandalorian plants explosives on Gideon's fighter, which brings down the craft. With the Imperials seemingly dealt with, Karga invites the Mandalorian to return to the Guild, but he refuses as he must take care of the Child. Dune elects to remain behind to work as Karga's enforcer. The Mandalorian buries Kuiil's body beneath a cairn of stones and departs Nevarro. Meanwhile, Gideon cuts himself out of the crashed fighter with the Darksaber.

Production

Development
The episode was directed by Taika Waititi and written by Jon Favreau.

Casting
The co-starring actors cast for this episode are Taika Waititi as the voice of IG-11, Giancarlo Esposito as Moff Gideon, Gina Carano as Cara Dune, Carl Weathers as Greef Karga, and Emily Swallow as the Armorer. Swallow previously appeared in Chapter 1: The Mandalorian and Chapter 3: The Sin, but was credited as a guest star. Additional guest starring actors cast for this episode include Jason Sudeikis and Adam Pally as two bike scout troopers, Aidan Bertola as young Din Djarin, Alexandra Manea as Din Djarin's mother, Bernard Bullen as Din Djarin's father, and Brendan Wayne as a Mandalorian warrior. Wayne and Lateef Crowder are credited as stunt doubles for the Mandalorian. Rio Hackford is credited as performance artist IG-11, while Gene Freeman and Lauren Mary Kim are credited as stunt doubles for Greef Karga and the Armorer. "The Child" was performed by various puppeteers.

Music
Ludwig Göransson composed the musical score for the episode. The soundtrack album for the episode was released on December 27, 2019.

Reception

Critical response

"Redemption" received critical acclaim. On Rotten Tomatoes, the episode holds an approval rating of 100% with an average rating of 8.4/10, based on 29 reviews. The website's critics consensus reads, "The Mandalorian concludes with whiz-bang action and a heartening dose of "Redemption" while teasing tantalizing new adventures to come."

In a positive review, Tyler Hersko, of IndieWire, felt the episode had "heroism, sacrifice, humor, excitable nods to key franchise elements, and tantalizing teases of where the Disney+ show could go in Season 2." Alan Sepinwall, of Rolling Stone, felt that "The Mandalorian season finale, "Redemption", coming up just as soon as we make the baby do the magic hands."

Media reported on negative fan reactions to a scene where the scout trooper played by Jason Sudeikis punched "Baby Yoda".

Awards

The episode was nominated for four Primetime Emmy Awards; Primetime Emmy Award for Outstanding Music Composition for a Series for Ludwig Göransson, Primetime Emmy Award for Outstanding Single-Camera Picture Editing for a Drama Series for Jeff Seibenick, Primetime Emmy Award for Outstanding Guest Actor in a Drama Series for Esposito's performance as Gideon, and Primetime Emmy Award for Outstanding Character Voice-Over Performance for Waititi's performance as IG-11, the latter being the first nomination for a live-action series. The episode won the award for Outstanding Music Composition for a Series.

Notes

References

External links
 
 

2019 American television episodes
The Mandalorian episodes
Television episodes directed by Taika Waititi